Pyroderces bifurcata is a moth in the family Cosmopterigidae. It is found in China (Anhui, Guizhou, Hunan, Jiangxi, Tianjin).

The wingspan is 11.5–13.5 mm. The forewings are greyish ochreous brown or deep ochreous brown. The hindwings are deep grey.

Etymology
The species name refers to the bifurcate apex of the left brachium and is derived from the Latin prefix bi- (meaning two) and the furcatus (meaning furcate).

References

Natural History Museum Lepidoptera generic names catalog

bifurcata
Moths described in 2009